The canton of Orthez et Terres des Gaves et du Sel (before 2015: canton of Orthez) is a canton of France, in the Pyrénées-Atlantiques department. Its chief town is Orthez.

Composition

At the French canton reorganisation which came into effect in March 2015, the canton was renamed and expanded from 13 to 40 communes:

Abitain 
Andrein
Athos-Aspis
Auterrive
Autevielle-Saint-Martin-Bideren
Baigts-de-Béarn
Barraute-Camu
Bellocq
Bérenx
Burgaronne
Carresse-Cassaber
Castagnède
Castetbon
Escos
Espiute
Guinarthe-Parenties
L'Hôpital-d'Orion
Laàs
Labastide-Villefranche
Lahontan
Lanneplaà
Léren
Montfort
Narp
Oraàs
Orion
Orriule
Orthez  
Ossenx
Puyoô
Ramous
Saint-Boès
Saint-Dos
Saint-Girons-en-Béarn
Saint-Gladie-Arrive-Munein
Saint-Pé-de-Léren
Salies-de-Béarn
Salles-Mongiscard
Sauveterre-de-Béarn
Tabaille-Usquain

Recent history

See also
 Cantons of the Pyrénées-Atlantiques department
 Communes of the Pyrénées-Atlantiques department

References

External links
 Gateway to Béarn of the Gaves: the cantons of Navarrenx, Orthez, Salies-de-Béarn and Sauveterre-de-Béarn.

Orthez et Terres des Gaves et du Sel